Nick Okorie (born July 22, 1988) is an American professional basketball player for Horse Owners Club in Alexandria, Egypt. He played college basketball for South Plains College and Texas Tech.

High school career
Okorie attended Kempner High School in Sugar Land, Texas, where he played basketball under head coach Ronnie Edwards. He was a member of the team's starting lineup for three years. He was named All-District in his final two seasons with the Cougars. Okorie averaged 19.7 points, 5.0 rebounds, and 5.0 assists per game as a senior and competed at the Texas High School Coaches Association (THSCA) All-Star Game.

Collegiate career
Okorie played college basketball with the Texas Tech Red Raiders and South Plains College.

Professional career
Okorie was named National Basketball League of Canada (NBL) All-Star in 2013, when he was with the Mississauga Power. Okorie has previously competed in the Danish Basketball League, 2. Basketball Bundesliga, and the Korisliiga outside of North America.

On September 30, 2015, Okorie signed with WBC Wels of the Austrian League.

On November 16, 2015, Okorie signed a training camp deal with the London Lightning in his return to the NBL Canada. He was acquired after the Lightning traded Renaldo Dixon and rights to Brent Jennings to the Island Storm. The Lightning also received the fifth and seventh picks in the 2015 NBL Canada draft.
In October 2016, the Island Storm announced Okorie had signed to return for the 2016–17 season. On March 13, 2017, Okorie was traded to the Niagara River Lions in exchange for Mike Allison and Niagara's 2nd round pick in the All-Canadian draft.

References

External links
Nick Okorie at Eurobasket.com
Nick Okorie at RealGM
Nick Okorie at Scout.com
Texas Tech bio

1988 births
Living people
American expatriate basketball people in Austria
American expatriate basketball people in Brazil
American expatriate basketball people in Canada
American expatriate basketball people in Finland
American expatriate basketball people in Germany
Basketball players from Minneapolis
Basketball players from Texas
Island Storm players
South Plains Texans basketball players
London Lightning players
Mississauga Power players
Niagara River Lions players
Oshawa Power players
People from Sugar Land, Texas
Texas Tech Red Raiders basketball players
American men's basketball players
Point guards